Weerayut Chansook (also known as Arm, born 30 October 1991) is a Thai actor, host and singer. He is known for his guest role as Pop in GMMTV's Friend Zone 2: Dangerous Area (2020) and support roles as Him in U-Prince Series (2016–2017) and Putt in Water Boyy: The Series (2017). He also hosts several shows such as School Rangers, Arm Share and Friend Drive.

Early life and education 
Weerayut was born in Nakhon Pathom Province, Thailand and is the third among four siblings. He completed his secondary education at Phrapathom Wittayalai School. In 2015, he graduated with a bachelor's degree in fine arts, major in acting and directing from the Faculty of Fine Arts at Srinakharinwirot University.

Career 
In 2007, he participated in the Luk Thung Star Contest. He won as first runner-up in the said competition and later enrolled in a singing school. He started in the entertainment industry in 2010 as an artist under RS. Aside from singing, Weerayut also had a passion for hosting and modelling.

Weerayut joined GMMTV in 2016 where he debuted as an actor in Senior Secret Love: Bake Me Love (2016) as he played the support role of San. He later landed acting roles in several television series such as U-Prince Series (2016–2017), Water Boyy: The Series (2017), YOUniverse (2018), Mint To Be (2018) and Love at First Hate (2018).

Representing his home county, he performed together with his fellow GMMTV artist  (Amp) in South Korea during the 2018 DMC Festival, an annual event organized by Munhwa Broadcasting Corporation (MBC).

He has also been recently known for his fashion and styling skills through his lifestyle program Arm Share.

Filmography

Television

Discography

MC
 Television 
 2011 : Boy Series On Air Channel 5
 2011 : Rookie BB Follow U Follow Me พุธ 16.00 น. On Air YAAK TV (2011-2012)
 2011 : 2 Nite Live ซีซั่นที่ 3 On Air Channel 5
 2013 : You Handsome On Air You Channel

 Online 
 2020 : AWC VLOG EP.1 On Air YouTube:AWC STUDIO

References

External links 
 
 

1991 births
Living people
Weerayut Chansook
Weerayut Chansook
Weerayut Chansook
Weerayut Chansook
Weerayut Chansook
Weerayut Chansook
Thai television personalities
Weerayut Chansook